Antonietta Di Martino (born 1 June 1978) is a retired Italian high jumper. She currently holds the Italian national women's high jump record at 2.03 metres for outdoor events and 2.04 metres for indoor events. She also currently holds the women's all-time highest jump-differential, meaning she has jumped the highest (0.35 metres) more than her own height.

Her first significant international achievement was winning silver medal at the 2007 European Indoor Championships in Birmingham. In the same year, she won the silver medal at the 2007 World Championships in Osaka. After a disappointing Olympics in Beijing, she won her first gold medal at the European Indoor Championships in 2011 in Paris and the bronze medal at the 2011 World Championships in Daegu. In 2012, she won another silver medal at the World Indoor Championships.

Biography

Early years (1990–2001)
Di Martino was born in Cava de' Tirreni. Her athletics history began at the age of 12 at the Youth Games, which highlighted her beginnings. Coincidentally, the high jump was not her first specialty. For much of her youth, she practiced the javelin throw and continued trying for multiple disciplines. She debuted in the national team for heptathlon in the European Cup in 2001.

Early achievements (2001–2006)
Her skills as a high jumper were first discovered in July 2001, during the Italian Championship in Catania when her jump raised her personal best from 1.93 to 1.98 meters, thus equalling the personal best of accomplished Italian high-jumper Antonella Bevilacqua. A month later, she was able to reach the world finals where she finished twelfth at the 2001 World Championships in Edmonton. In 2006, she finished fifth at the World Indoor Championships in Moscow and tenth at the European Championships in Gothenburg.

The Golden year - 2007
In February 2007, she cleared 2.00 metres in Banská Bystrica, breaking Sara Simeoni's previous Italian indoor record of 1.98 m. She followed this up with a silver medal at the 2007 European Indoor Championships, where she jumped 1.96 m. 

Di Martino also won the silver medal at 2007 World Championships, having jumped 2.03 m. Her 2008 season was not so successful and she managed only the tenth position at the 2008 Beijing Olympics and closed the year carrying a serious toe injury, making her consider retiring from the sport.

Her return (2009–2012)

In September 2009, she changed coach and a resurgence in her form. She won the Italian Indoor Championships, but illness ruled her out of the 2009 European Indoor Championships a few months later. She took bronze at the 2009 European Team Championships and soon after, she beat Blanka Vlašić to win the Golden Gala meeting, jumping 2.00 m in Rome. She cleared 1.99 m at the 2009 World Championships in Athletics, securing a fourth-place finish. She capped off the year with a bronze at the final edition of the World Athletics Final.

Antonietta Di Martino won the gold medal at the 2010 European Team Championships, but did not even pass the qualifying round at the 2010 European Athletics Championships. She rebounded at the start of the 2011 season, jumping to an Italian indoor record of 2.04 m in Banská Bystrica in Slovakia. She continued with her good form in March by winning the European Indoor Championship in Paris with 2.01 m.

Records and achievements
Her personal best outdoor jump is 2.03 metres, achieved on 24 June 2007, in Milan by surpassing her own previous Italian record of 2.02 m, while her best indoor result came at an indoor high jump meeting in Slovakia on 9 February 2011 with a new national record of 2.04 m. Standing at only 1.69 m, this jump is the unofficial women's world record for the highest jump over her own height (at 35 cm). Di Martino used to be active in heptathlon, achieving a personal best of 5542 points (2001).

Missing the 2012 Summer Olympics
Di Martino suffered an injury on her knee in April 2012, just four months before the Olympic Games. She was forced to temporarily stop training. However, the National Athletics Federation (FIDAL) underestimate the nature of the injury, which was diagnosed in the three weeks of rehabilitation. But less than a month before the Olympics, they learned that the injury was more serious than expected, forcing her to undergo surgery, ruling her out of London. Her knee surgery was performed just a few days before the race in the Olympics high jump.

Her coach  in an interview, accused the FIDAL have underestimated the nature of the injury and failing to ensure an athlete who has contributed immensely to Italian sport the right care at the time of rehabilitation.

National records
 High jump outdoor: 2.03 m ( Milan, 24 June 2007 and  Osaka, 2 September 2007) - current holder
 High jump indoor: 2.04 m ( Banská Bystrica, 9 February 2009) - current holder

Achievements
 

Amtonietta Di Martino made 12 career jumps over 2.00 m (bolded in the table).

Others meetings and championships

National championships
Antonietta Di Martino has won the individual national championship 10 times.
6 wins in High jump outdoor (2000, 2001, 2006, 2007, 2008, 2010)
4 wins in High jump indoor (2003, 2006, 2007, 2009)

Progression
Antonietta Di Martino ranked 15 times in the top 25 of the world for the season list. Her 2.04 m indoor is also the 8th best performance of all-time. 

Outdoor

Indoor

High Jump Differentials
 
All time lists of athletes with the highest recorded jumps above their own height.

See also
 Female two metres club
 High Jump Differentials - Women
 Italian all-time top lists - High jump
 Italian records in athletics
 Women's high jump Italian record progression
 Women's high jump winners of Italian Athletics Championships

Notes

References

External links
 
 
 
 
 Official Website  

1978 births
Living people
People from Cava de' Tirreni
Italian female high jumpers
Italian female pentathletes
Italian heptathletes
Athletes (track and field) at the 2008 Summer Olympics
Olympic athletes of Italy
Athletics competitors of Fiamme Gialle
World Athletics Championships medalists
Mediterranean Games gold medalists for Italy
Athletes (track and field) at the 2009 Mediterranean Games
World Athletics Championships athletes for Italy
Sportspeople from the Province of Salerno
Mediterranean Games medalists in athletics